Kerne Bridge was built over the River Wye in the County of Herefordshire, England in 1825–28, on the site of an ancient ford crossing known as Flanesford. It is designated as a Scheduled Monument. Carrying the B4229 road, it connects the parishes of Walford on the river's left bank and Goodrich on the right. It is situated in the heart of the Wye Valley Area of Outstanding Natural Beauty and marks the northern end of the Upper Wye Gorge.

History

Kerne Bridge was built on the site of a Pre-Roman ford across the River Wye. This ancient crossing came to be known as Flanesford long before 1346 when the first stone of Flanesford Priory was laid nearby "in loco Flanesford vulgariter nuncupato" (in the place commonly called Flanesford).
 
The origins of the name Flanesford are obscure. It has been suggested that it was derived from an English-Welsh conjunction, the Welsh llan (church or enclosure) joined to the English ford, or possibly the Welsh ffordd (way) but it is more likely the prefix is the Old English flanes from flan (arrow).

On the Forest of Dean side of the ford, on the left bank, a primitive manually-operated mill for grinding corn came to be established. This type of mill was known in Old English as a cweorn.  The presence of the mill gave the name - The Cweorn - to the small settlement which became established there. Over time the spelling of the name of the settlement was simplified to The Quern. Records show that it was still known that way until at least 1815, but by the mid-1820s spelling simplification had further altered its name to The Kerne.

Flanesford became an increasingly crucial river crossing for trade and the delivery of commodities from the Forest of Dean to the city of Hereford and south Herefordshire generally. Of most importance was the transport of iron from the Bishopswood ironworks on the left bank of the Wye just downstream from Flanesford, and of coal from the collieries of the Forest of Dean (particularly as the fast-growing population and industry of Hereford required increasing amounts of coal). As well as iron and coal the 18th and 19th centuries saw a steady growth in south Herefordshire "in the numbers of wagons and carts drawn by horses or oxen. Daily commodities of stone, brick, timber, poles, lathes, lime, ... corn, hay and manure were conveyed.".

The ford, however, could only be used when the river was not in flood. While travellers on foot deemed it acceptable to wade across up to armpit depth and horses could be taken across up to chest height  the river had a tendency to flood extremely quickly following poor weather upstream, which writers of the early nineteenth century wrote gave the river "a force which defies all the ordinary means of resistance and control". When Flanesford and other fords nearby were unusable, and the local ferries capable of carrying animals were unable to sail, the only alternatives for road transport were the bridges upstream at Wilton, near Ross-on-Wye, and downstream at Monmouth (Trefynwy). They were 21 river-miles apart and because of the poor roads and the mileage involved, diversions via the bridges were long, time-consuming and expensive.

An alternative means of transport - using barges on the river - was equally unfeasible at times of flood, or in dry summer when the river bed was "barely covered with the stream". The 35-miles distance to Hereford by the river was also two-thirds further than by road.

A further obstruction to trade was that the roads in Herefordshire were historically in a neglected and wretched condition. One Herefordshire historian has described the roads in the county as "impenetrable and impassable, churned into mud by horses hooves and deeply rutted by wheeled vehicles". Though the county's roads were being steadily improved after the mid-eighteenth century by the introduction of turnpike trusts, in 1825 the first few miles of parish roads from Flanesford towards Hereford remained in an appalling state.

Proposals for a bridge at Flanesford
 
By the early 1820s local industrialists and traders had decided that a bridge should be erected over the ford, between the hamlet of The Kerne and Flanesford Priory, with upgraded roads proceeding onwards 3 kilometres or so to Old Forge, where they would join the turnpikes to Ross-on-Wye and Hereford, "by means of which a more convenient communication will be effected between the Collieries in the Forest of Dean and the County of Hereford".

Those who proposed the bridge were not without opposition, however. They faced competition from the owners of the Goodrich-Walford Ferry, situated 700 metres upstream from The Kerne, whose owners wanted to build their own bridge at Goodrich Boat on the 1749 Ross to Goodrich turnpike (previously a Roman road). They notified their intentions to lay a Bill before Parliament only two weeks after the Kerne Bridge advocates had announced their similar application. The Goodrich-Walford bridge plan was not pursued, however, and the ferry, although facing severe competition from Kerne Bridge, continued to provide a service under a statutory duty until 1945.

There was no recorded opposition from another ferry, which had been operating for at least 106 years only about 400 metres downstream from Flanesford, known as the Stocking Boat (named after June Stockings, the occupier at one time of a cottage near the ferry on the right bank of the river).  It continued to operate despite the competition from Kerne Bridge. However, the erection of Kerne railway bridge across the river in 1873 saw the ferry's business much reduced, leading to its closure. Despite regulations to the contrary, the rail bridge was much used by pedestrians as a short cut and as a means of avoiding the tolls on Kerne Bridge.

Some of those whose commercial or landowning interests might have been about to be jeopardised by a new bridge made public their objections. One correspondent to the Hereford Journal newspaper in 1823 complained of "the evils" that would arise, such as "the cutting through of valuable Lands and Orcharding for Miles, dividing Homesteads from Farms, running through Parishes where there are already good and sufficient Roads nearly parallel with and close to this projected line; that it must eventually be throwing on such Parishes as well as on the Agricultural Interest of this County, unnecessary burthens and extra Tolls as may readily be seen upon estimating the enormous expense of making the Bridge and Road, probably £20,000!!!"

Kerne Bridge tolls

The 1825 Act of Parliament enabling the building of Kerne Bridge gave power to erect toll gates and charge tolls to those crossing the bridge

The original tolls specified in the Act were 9d for every horse or other beast drawing a wheeled vehicle other than a farm vehicle, 6d for every beast drawing an agricultural vehicle, 2d for every horse or mule laden or unladen, and not drawing a wheeled vehicle, 1d for every ass, 10d for every 20 head of cattle, swine, sheep or lambs, 1d for every person crossing the bridge on foot or riding on or in a wheeled vehicle or riding on a beast drawing a wheeled vehicle.

A board listing the tolls was to be erected, the table being painted "in distinct and legible Black Letters, on a Board with a White Ground". A person would need to pay only one toll per day in the event of crossing the bridge more than once in 24 hours, except for stage coaches which would be expected to pay for every crossing.

Exceptions to paying the tolls were the King and any members of the Royal Family or any person or vehicle on the King's business, the mail, soldiers and their animals and vehicles, and any vehicle carrying a prisoner.

The penalty for evading a toll was a fine not exceeding £5.

The Kerne Bridge Company was also empowered to erect a toll house as a residence and working place for a toll collector. The company built a two-roomed, stone toll house, on the upstream side of the left bank end of the bridge, where the toll gates were situated.

The Tolls were let by an annual auction, usually held at the Cross Keys Inn in Goodrich. The highest bidder would immediately have to pay down two months’ rent in advance and give security to the satisfaction of the company for payment of the remainder of the rent by monthly instalments in advance and also guarantee to perform the necessary duties of a toll collector, or employ others to carry out the work. The toll collectors were also known as pikemen or toll-gate keepers.

Kerne Bridge toll-gate keepers 

 1847 Cornelius Harding
 1851 Cornelius Harding
 1854 Catharine Meredith
 1856 Mr Andrews
 1871 John Reece
 1881 James Hunt
 1887 Joseph Homfray
 1895 Alice Williams
 1899 Mr Staddon
 1901 William Hames
 1911 William Hames
 1914 George Spiller
 1917 Amos Rayner
 1922 John H Pascoe
 1948 Samuel Wooley

Removal of the tolls 

A call for the removal of the tolls on the bridge was made locally in November 1890 urging that Herefordshire County Council adopt the bridge and in September 1919 on the grounds that there was a grave scarcity of river crossings in the area and that local residents and tradespeople should not have to pay, in particular to reach Kerne Bridge railway station.

In 1928 talks were held between Herefordshire County Council and the Hereford Chamber of Commerce on the matter of removing tolls from the remaining toll bridges in the county, Kerne Bridge being one of only five bridges continuing to charge tolls.

Kerne Bridge was taken over from The Kerne Bridge Company by Herefordshire County Council in November 1947. In the following April Labour Member of Parliament Edwin Gooch asked the Minister of Transport in the House of Commons if it was the intention of Herefordshire County Council to free Kerne Bridge of tolls. The minister, Alfred Barnes, replied that he had authorised the council to continue the tolls until the end of June 1948, "by which time works required to make the approach roads suitable for unrestricted traffic should have been carried out".

The deadline of June was not met, but the tolls were removed in September 1948.

As it no longer served a purpose, the toll gate was removed in the mid-1950s and the toll house was demolished shortly afterwards. The remaining foundations of the house can still be found, though much overgrown. The original gate was preserved and installed at the entrance to a house in Hope Mansell, Herefordshire.

Railway alterations

Alterations were made to the left-bank end of the bridge, destroying its symmetry, in 1873. It was raised onto an embankment to allow for a bridge over the newly built Ross and Monmouth Railway line. While the roadway and parapets extend at a level height, the downward incline of the original string course above the spandrels, and the old parapet, are visible below the later stonework.

Following closure of the railway in 1965  the railway bridge was mostly demolished and the land filled in but the embankment and alterations to the bridge's elevation were left in place.

Second World War defences

In 1940, during the Second World War, Kerne Bridge was designated as a Centre of Resistance on the Western Command Stop Line No. 27, which followed the line of the River Wye from its mouth to Hay-on-Wye (Y Gelli Gandryll). As a result of this designation two defensive pillboxes - brick-built rifle positions with concrete bases and roofs and earth banked up to just below the rifle embrasures - were erected at the Goodrich end of the bridge in the period 1940–41.

One was located approximately 365 metres southwest of Kerne Bridge and about 135 metres south of the road; the other was positioned about 135 metres to the north, 275 metres west of Kerne Bridge and adjoining the road on the south side. They were recorded in July 1995 by 2 Military Intelligence Company (believed to be the only records that exist). The pillboxes were demolished in 1997 as part of an agricultural land improvement scheme. The remaining rubble can still be found in the field adjacent to the bridge on the downstream side and irregularly deposited under the right-bank flood arch, where it obstructs the smooth flow of floodwater.

Listing

As a building of national importance Kerne Bridge is designated a Scheduled Monument under the Ancient Monuments and Archeological Areas Act 1979. It is also listed Grade II for its special architectural and historic interest by the Historic Buildings and Monuments Commission for England. Under the law, Kerne Bridge's statutory listings warrant every effort to preserve it.

The current use of Kerne Bridge

Kerne Bridge carries the B4229 towards the A40 from the junction with the B4234 in the hamlet of Kerne Bridge (whose name was adapted from the original one of The Kerne following the building of the bridge) on the River Wye's left bank. On the 21 river-miles between Monmouth to the south and Wilton to the north it is the only bridge able to sustain heavy goods traffic.

Such traffic travelling north on the B4234 towards Ross-on-Wye is diverted over the bridge towards the A40, except for local access.

Telecommunication cables cross the river via the bridge, beneath the roadway.

The location of the bridge's piers causes fast water and strong, converging currents and rapids immediately below the bridge, which can be a risk for modern-day canoeists.

The bridge is the starting point for a fundraising plastic duck “duck race” staged every August Bank Holiday by the local community.

In March 2020, following the highest floods ever recorded on the Wye, Kerne Bridge was inspected by Herefordshire Council for damage that may have been caused to the foundations. Sonar, an underwater camera and a system of sensors using mobile bridge-surveying technology checked below the waterline and found no faults.

References

Bridges in Herefordshire
Bridges across the River Wye
Bridges completed in the 1820s